Just Suppose is a 1926 American silent drama film produced by and starring Richard Barthelmess with distribution through First National Pictures. Kenneth Webb directed Barthelmess and young Lois Moran star. The film is based on the 1920 Broadway play Just Suppose by Albert E. Thomas.

Plot
As described in a film magazine review, Rupert, the second son of the King of Koronia, goes to America where he meets Linda Lee Stafford, a young woman he previously had become acquainted with back home. He tells her of his love for her. Rupert is then called back to Koronia upon the death of his older brother the Crown Prince, putting Rupert in direct line to the throne. However, twins are then born to the widow of the deceased Crown Prince. This makes Rupert free to wed whom he will, and he rushes to see Linda who has returned to Europe on a visit.

Cast
Richard Barthelmess as Prince Rupert of Koronia
Lois Moran as Linda Lee Stafford
Geoffrey Kerr as Count Anton Teschy
Henry Vibart as Baron Karnaby
George Spelvin as King (George Spelvin is a  pseudonym)
Harry Short as Crown Prince
Bijou Fernandez as Mrs. Stafford
Prince Rokneddin as Private Secretary

Preservation
A print of Just Suppose is in the UCLA Film and Television Archive.

References

External links

Lantern slide (Wayback Machine)

1926 films
American silent feature films
Films directed by Kenneth Webb
American films based on plays
First National Pictures films
1926 romantic drama films
American romantic drama films
American black-and-white films
1920s American films
Silent romantic drama films
Silent American drama films